The Győr-Moson-Sopron County Council is the local legislative body of Győr-Moson-Sopron County in Hungary. After the elections in 2019, it consists 21 councillors, and is controlled by the Fidesz which has 15 councillors, versus 2 Jobbik, 2 Democratic Coalition, and 2 Momentum Movement councillors.

Sources 

Local government in Hungary
Győr-Moson-Sopron County